Reyes del Show is the season three of the 2010 edition of El Gran Show premiered on November 6, 2010.

On December 18, 2010, Miguel "Conejo" Rebosio and Fabianne Hayashida were crowned champions, Belén Estévez & Gian Frank Navarro finished second, while Gisela Ponce de León & Rayder Vásquez were third.

Cast

Couples
The couples that competed this season were the top three places in the first and second seasons, the best fourth place (determined by the highest average scores) who were Stephanie Orué and Licky Barreto, and a couple invited by the jury, being Fernando Roca Rey and Whitney Misme.

In the first week, it was announced that two heroines could not compete due to work reasons: Stephanie Orué, who was replaced by Rebeca Escribens (eighth place of the second season), and Maricarmen Marín, who was replaced by Pierina Carcelen (seventh put in the first season).

Previous seasons

Host and judges
Gisela Valcárcel, Aldo Díaz and Cristian Rivero returned as hosts, while Morella Petrozzi, Carlos Alcántara, Pachi Valle Riestra, Stuart Bishop and the VIP Jury returned as judges.

Scoring charts

Red numbers indicate the sentenced for each week
Green numbers indicate the best steps for each week
 the couple was eliminated that week
 the couple was safe in the duel
 the winning couple
 the runner-up couple
 the third-place couple

Average score chart
This table only counts dances scored on a 40-point scale (the VIP Jury scores are excluded).

Highest and lowest scoring performances
The best and worst performances in each dance according to the judges' 40-point scale (the VIP Jury scores are excluded) are as follows:

Couples' highest and lowest scoring dances
Scores are based upon a potential 40-point maximum (the VIP Jury scores are excluded).

Weekly scores 
Individual judges' scores in the charts below (given in parentheses) are listed in this order from left to right: Morella Petrozzi, Stuart Bishop, Carlos Alcántara, Pachi Valle Riestra, VIP Jury.

Week 1: Jive 
The couples danced jive and a danceathon of cumbia. In the versus, the couples faced dancing salsa.
Running order

 Public's favorite couple: Karen & Edward (2 pts).

Week 2: The Pop Stars 
The couples danced pop (except those sentenced), a team dance of jazz and a danceathon of pachanga.
Running order

 Public's favorite couple: Karen & Edward (2 pts).
*The duel
Rebeca & Licky: Eliminated
Pierina & Diego: Safe

Week 3: Merengue 
The couples danced merengue (except those sentenced), a team dance of festejo and a danceathon of salsa.
Running order

 Public's favorite couple: Fernando & Whitney (2 pts).
*The duel
Pierina & Diego: Safe
Jesús & Cindy: Eliminated

Week 4: Aerodance/Disco 
The couples danced aerodance, disco (except those sentenced) and a danceathon of danza de tijeras.
Running order

 Public's favorite couple: Karen & Edward (2 pts).
*The duel
Conejo & Fabianne: Eliminated
Pierina & Diego: Safe

Week 5: Quarterfinals 
The couples danced trio lambada involving another celebrity (except those sentenced), Bollywood and a danceathon of cumbia.
Running order

 Public's favorite couple: Karen & Edward (2 pts).
*The duel
Fernando & Whitney: Eliminated
Gisela & Rayder: Safe

Week 6: Semifinals 
The couples danced one unlearned ballroom dance, merengue house (except those sentenced), a team dance of pachanga and a danceathon of cumbia.
Running order

 Public's favorite couple: Belén & Gian Frank (2 pts).
*The duel
Karen & Edward: Eliminated
Conejo & Fabianne: Safe

Week 7: Finals 
On the first part, the couples danced salsa and freestyle.

On the second part, the final two couples danced a mix (cumbia/latin pop/quebradita) and waltz.
Running order (Part 1)

Running order (Part 2)

Dance chart
The celebrities and their dreamers will dance one of these routines for each corresponding week:
 Week 1: Jive, the danceathon & the versus (Jive)
 Week 2: Pop, team dances & the danceathon (The Pop Stars)
 Week 3: Merengue, team dances & the danceathon (Merengue)
 Week 4: Aerodance, disco & the danceathon (Aerodance/Disco)
 Week 5: Trio lambada, Bollywood & the danceathon (Quarterfinals)
 Week 6: One unlearned ballroom dance, merengue, team dances & the danceathon (Semifinals)
 Week 7: Salsa, freestyle, mix (cumbia/latin pop/quebradita) & waltz (Finals)

 Highest scoring dance
 Lowest scoring dance
 Gained bonus points for winning this dance
 Gained no bonus points for losing this dance
In italic indicate the dances performed in the duel

References

External links

El Gran Show
2010 Peruvian television seasons
Reality television articles with incorrect naming style